Sandahl Bergman is an American actress and dancer. She is best known for her role as Valeria in the film Conan the Barbarian (1982), for which she won a Golden Globe and a Saturn Award.

Early life 
Bergman was born in Kansas City, Missouri. She graduated from Shawnee Mission East High School in Prairie Village, Kansas.

Career
In her 20s, she moved to New York City and appeared in a number of Broadway shows, catching the eye of choreographer Bob Fosse, who cast her as a replacement dancer in Pippin. She had a secondary lead in the stage version of the film Gigi in 1973, and later appeared in Mack & Mabel, and as Judy in the renowned "new New York cast" of A Chorus Line (when many of the original actors left the show in 1977). She was cast again by Fosse in his critically acclaimed 1978 dance concert/musical Dancin', which featured many of the top dancers on Broadway at the time.

Bergman's movie career began in 1978 with a small role in the TV film How to Pick Up Girls. She followed that in 1979 with the Bob Fosse film All That Jazz, in which she was a featured performer in the "Take Off With Us" sequence. In the 1980 movie Xanadu, she appears as one of the nine immortal Muses during the opening song "I'm Alive" by ELO, as well as the final title number of "Xanadu".

Bergman's participation in Xanadu also led indirectly to her eviction from her apartment in New York and subsequent relocation to California. She had been subletting her apartment in New York in defiance of a clause in her agreement with her landlord, and during her four months in California for filming, he became aware of the situation. Bergman has said she did not return to New York, instead having friends pack and ship her belongings to her.

Her best-known role was playing Valeria opposite Arnold Schwarzenegger in the 1982 film Conan the Barbarian. She won the Golden Globe Award for New Star of the Year - Actress for her role in the film. Because no stunt women could be found to match her size, she learned to do all her own stunt work. She commented on the experience, "It was tough. I nearly lost a finger. Arnold smashed his head against a rock. But that was nothing compared to what the stunt men went through."

In 1984 she played the titular role in the post-apocalytic comedy-adventure She, while she played queen Gedren the next year in Red Sonja. She was offered the title role, but asked to play the villainess instead. After that, she appeared in a series of low-budget films, such as 1987's Hell Comes to Frogtown. Her most recent work was in 2003, when at the age of 52 she appeared as a dancer in the film version of The Singing Detective. Other appearances include a lunar base officer in the movie Airplane II: The Sequel, the music video "Heavy Metal Love" by the band Helix and the Fred Olen Ray film Possessed by the Night, and guest appearances on television, such as Hart to Hart and a dance sequence choreographed by Stanley Donen in an episode of Moonlighting.

Bergman worked as an instructor for the FIRM series of exercise videos in the 1980s.

Bergman has since retired from acting, but still makes the occasional appearance at sci-fi conventions.

Filmography

Film

Television

References

External links

Living people
American people of Swedish descent
Actresses from Kansas City, Missouri
American female dancers
American dancers
American film actresses
American musical theatre actresses
American stunt performers
American television actresses
New Star of the Year (Actress) Golden Globe winners
20th-century American actresses
21st-century American actresses
Year of birth missing (living people)